A feeder fund is an investment fund which does almost all of its investments through a master fund via a master-feeder relationship.

It is a situation similar to a fund of funds, except that the master fund performs all the investments.

Sources
 Feeder funds 
Investopedia, James Chen, April 30th 2018: https://www.investopedia.com/terms/f/feederfund.asp

Investment funds